Tropical Jazz Big Band (Nettai Jazz Gakudan); incorrectly referred to in the United States as Nettai Tropical Jazz Big Band, is a Japanese latin jazz big band.

Led by Carlos Kanno from Orquesta de la Luz, the Tropical Jazz Big Band started out as a group of friends playing for fun and evolved into an 18-piece ensemble. Boasting four percussionists, a three-piece rhythm section, and powerful horns, the band released their first album Live in Yokohama in 1998. That year the band also played in United States. They have played at various jazz festivals and venues, including Carnegie Hall in New York City, United States.

Members 
 Shirō Sasaki, Trumpet
 Masanor Suzuki, Trumpet
 Kenji Matsushima, Trumpet
 Sho Okumura, Trumpet
 Hideaki Nakaji, Trombone
 Dairo Miyamoto, Bass Saxophone 
 Taisei Aoki, Trombone
 Kan Nishida, Bass Trombone
 Kazuhiko Kondo, Alto Saxophone
 Masahiro Fujioka, Alto Saxophone
 Manteru Nonoda, Tenor Saxophone
 Salt Shionoya, Piano
 Getao Takahashi, Bass
 Akira Jimbo, Drums
 Carlos Kanno, Percussion
 Michiaki Tanaka, Percussion
 Cosmos Kapitza, Percussion
 Gen Ogimi, Percussion
 Yoshi Iba, Percussion

Discography 
 Nettai I - Live in Yokohama (1998)
First Live Concert Recording and first overall album
 Nettai II - September (1999)
 Nettai III - My Favorite (2000)
 Nettai IV - La Rumba (2000)
 Nettai V - La Noche Tropical (2001)
 Nettai VI - En Vivo (2002)
Second Live Concert Recording
 Nettai VII - Spain (2003)
 Nettai VIII - The Covers (2004)
First Compilation of their Cover-songs from the previous albums
 Nettai IX - Mas Tropical (2005)
 Nettai X - Swing con Clave (2006)
 Nettai XI - Let's Groove (2007)
 Nettai XII - The Originals (2008)
Compilation of Original Compositions from the previous albums
 Nettai XIII - Fantasy (2009)
 Nettai XIV - Liberty (2010)
 Nettai XV - Covers 2 (2012)
Second Compilation of their Cover-songs from the previous albums
 Nettai XVI - Easy Lover (2014)
 Nettai XVII - The Best from Movies (2015)
Compilation of their Cover-songs that were originally used in movies.

See also 
 Latin music
 Latin jazz

References

External links 
 

Japanese musical groups
Japanese jazz musicians
Big bands